This is a list of series released by or aired on TVB Jade Channel in 1982.

External links
TVB.com Official Website 

TVB dramas